Whittenella is a genus of moths of the family Tortricidae containing the sole species Whittenella peltosema.

See also 

List of Tortricidae genera

References

External links
tortricidae.com

Tortricidae genera
Monotypic moth genera
Taxa named by Marianne Horak
Olethreutinae